The Anson SA4 is an open-wheel race car, designed, developed and built by British manufacturer Anson Cars, for Formula 3 racing categories, in 1983.

References

Formula Three cars
Open wheel racing cars